Jamie Coleman (born June 16, 1975) is a former American football defensive specialist who played two seasons in the Arena Football League with the Nashville Kats and Tampa Bay Storm. He played college football at Appalachian State University.

References

External links
Just Sports Stats

Living people
1975 births
Players of American football from North Carolina
American football defensive backs
African-American players of American football
Appalachian State Mountaineers football players
Nashville Kats players
Tampa Bay Storm players
People from Laurinburg, North Carolina
21st-century African-American sportspeople
20th-century African-American sportspeople